St Luke's Church is a Church of England parish church in Maidenhead in the English county of Berkshire.

History
St Luke's Church was consecrated in 1866 by William Wilberforce. At a cost of £3500, it was designed by architect George Row Clarke of London, and built by James Griffiths of Eldersfield. A tower was added in 1869, and then a spire was built in 1894.

The Church today
The church building remains the largest church in Maidenhead, and as a result has been used for the recording of Songs of Praise on two occasions. Recent alterations to the church include new glazed entrance doors, a new servery at the west end, refurbished kitchen and toilets, and new vestry and office created in the former Parish Centre.

Ministry team
The Vicar since June 2011 is the Revd Sally Lynch. She is assisted by the Revd Phyl Sopp, and Revd Terrie Robinson.

Arts projects
St Luke's has run a biennial summer Arts Project since 2006, when the former vicar Richard Holroyd organised 'In Tents'. Other projects included one about Saints in 2012,and in 2014 on the theme of "Noah", during which participants built an ark and made animals out of a variety of craft materials to sail in it.

Music Festival
The church is regularly used as a concert venue, as well as hosting two-week Music Festivals in 2013, 2015, and 2017.

Christmas Tree Festival
Since 2011 there has been an annual Christmas Tree festival featuring up to 50 real trees which individuals and local organisations decorate to compete for the "best dressed tree". The event raises a significant amount of money for charity.

References

External links
 St Luke's Church, Maidenhead's Website
 Diocese of Oxford Living Faith for the Future

Church of England church buildings in Berkshire
Anglo-Catholic church buildings in Berkshire